The 2007–08 season of the Slovak First League (also known as 1. liga) was the sixteenth season of the league since its establishment. It began in late July 2007 and ended in May 2008.

Team changes from 2006–07
Promoted in Corgoň Liga: ↑Zlaté Moravce↑
Relegated from Corgoň Liga: ↓Inter Bratislava↓
Promoted in 1. liga: ↑Prievidza↑, ↑Stará Ľubovňa↑, ↑Trebišov↑
Relegated from 1. liga: ↓Močenok×↓, ↓Dunajská Streda↓, ↓Turčianske Teplice↓

× - withdrew from league

Stadia and locations

League table

Top goalscorers

See also
2007–08 Slovak Superliga

References

External links
 Slovak FA official site 

2. Liga (Slovakia) seasons
2
Slovak